Nan Marie Jokerst is an American professor of Electrical and Computer Engineering at Duke University known for her work integrating optoelectronics with semiconductor substrates in order to create portable environmental and medical sensors. She is a Fellow of the Optical Society and Fellow of the Institute of Electrical and Electronics Engineers.

Since 2004, Jokerst has been J. A. Jones Distinguished Professor at Duke University. Jokerst previously served as faculty in the School of Electrical and Computer Engineering at Georgia Institute of Technology as the Joseph M. Pettit Professor of Optoelectronics.

Education

 BS in Mathematics, Creighton University, 1982 
 BS in Physics, Creighton University, 1982 
 MSEE in Electrical Engineering, University of Southern California, 1984
 PhD in Electrical Engineering, University of Southern California, 1989

Awards

 NSF Presidential Young Investigator Award, 1990
 IEEE Third Millennium Medal, 2000
 Fellow of the Optical Society, 2001
 IEEE Education Society Harris B. Rigas Medal, 2002
 IEEE Fellow, 2003
 Alumni in Academia Award for the University of Southern California Viterbi School of Engineering, 2006

References

American electrical engineers
Electrical engineering academics
American women engineers
Fellow Members of the IEEE
IEEE award recipients
Fellows of Optica (society)
Duke University faculty
USC Viterbi School of Engineering alumni
Creighton University alumni
Living people
Year of birth missing (living people)
Optical engineers
Women in optics
American women academics
21st-century American women